The Huang Family Historical Residence is a historical house in Ganpu Village, Linyuan District, Kaohsiung, Taiwan.

History
The house was constructed in 1834 by the Huang family who migrated to Taiwan from Fujian in the 18th century. In 1977, the house was damaged by Typhoon Thelma and was later renovated. The house was declared a historical building on 15 December 2003 because of its significant value to understand the development of the village. In March 2016, an opening ceremony was held to mark the end of renovation and the opening to the public.

Architecture
The house was constructed with the southern Fujian architectural style with five layers which spreads over an area of five hectares. The house has five halls with three wings on the left and nine wings on the right. The wings on the left and right are connected to the first main hall. The central room used to be the place for worship.

See also
 List of tourist attractions in Taiwan

References

1834 establishments in Taiwan
Buildings and structures in Kaohsiung
Houses completed in 1834
Houses in Taiwan
Tourist attractions in Kaohsiung